John Boyd (March 17, 1799 – December 1, 1881) was an American politician who served as a Connecticut state legislator and the Secretary of State of Connecticut.

Boyd, son of James and Mary (Munro) Boyd, of the borough of Winsted, in the town of Winchester, Conn., was born March 17, 1799.  After graduating from Yale College in 1821, he studied law in New Haven, with Messrs. Staples and Hitchcock, and was admitted to the bar in 1825.

He settled in his native town as an iron manufacturer, retiring from business in 1853, and was also largely occupied with public trusts. He was a representative in the Connecticut General Assembly of the State in 1830 and 1835, and a member of the Connecticut State Senate in 1854. For fifteen years he was Judge of Probate, and for twenty-six years Town Clerk of his native town. He was Secretary of State in 1859, 1860, and 1861.

In 1873 he published the Annals and Family Records of Winchester (octavo, pp. 632), a laborious work.

He was married, in New Haven, May 17, 1831, to Emily W., daughter of Elias Beers, who died November 25, 1842, at the age of 37, leaving three children, of whom one daughter only survived him. He next married, December 10, 1843, Jerusha, daughter of Solomon Rockwell, and widow of the Hon. Theodore Hinsdale, of Winsted, who died March 11, 1875, aged 72 years.  He died in West Winsted, in Winchester, December 1, 1881, in his 83rd year.

External links

1799 births
1881 deaths
People from Winsted, Connecticut
Yale College alumni
Connecticut state senators
American male writers
Connecticut lawyers
Connecticut local politicians
Secretaries of the State of Connecticut
Members of the Connecticut House of Representatives
Presidents pro tempore of the Connecticut Senate
Connecticut state court judges
19th-century American politicians
19th-century American judges
19th-century American lawyers